Parhaplothrix margaretae is a species of beetle in the family Cerambycidae. It was described by E. Forrest Gilmour in 1947. It is known from Malaysia.

References

Lamiini
Beetles described in 1947